Merlin’s Shop of Mystical Wonders is a 1996 American fantasy horror film written and directed by Kenneth J. Berton.

The film stars Ernest Borgnine as a grandfather telling his grandson a story about the wizard Merlin opening up a store in modern-day America. He tells him two separate stories about Merlin and the store.

Plot 

Although the opening segment implies that Merlin's magical interventions in people's lives are intended to have a benign effect, in practice this proves to be far from the case.

The first story focuses on a married couple, Jonathan and Madeline Cooper. Jonathan is a respected, though obnoxious columnist, and Madeline is desperate for a baby, as she and Jonathan have been unable to conceive. The couple visit the store, where Jonathan berates Merlin and threatens to write a negative article in the newspaper that will cause his readers to avoid the store. Merlin loans Jonathan his spell book as proof that he is actually the legendary wizard. Jonathan takes the book home and begins to toy with several of the spells. Jonathan becomes convinced of the book's authenticity when an unsuccessful spell to summon a spirit results in him having a vision of Satan and causing Jonathan to breathe fire. Jonathan quickly grows excited and becomes obsessed with the book's powers, but begins to dramatically age due to the rapid depletion of one's life force required to cast the spells. Jonathan attempts to transform his pet cat into a mystical servant, but it becomes demonic and proceeds to attack him. Using the spell from earlier, Jonathan breathes fire and burns the cat alive. By then, Jonathan has aged so severely that his hair is white and receded. Jonathan retrieves the book's rejuvenation spell and proceeds to create the required potion. He takes a sample of Madeline's blood and adds it to the mixture. Jonathan drinks the potion, but the spell backfires: Jonathan regresses into infancy. Madeline happily decides to raise her former husband as her own child.

In the second story, which bears a very close resemblance to Stephen King's short story "The Monkey", a thief steals a cymbal-banging-monkey toy from Merlin's shop, and sells it to a novelty store, where it is quickly bought as a present for a young boy. Every time the monkey's cymbals are struck, a nearby living thing dies. The boy's father takes the monkey and attempts to bury it, but it finds its way back into the boy's house. But before the monkey's cymbals are struck again, Merlin shows up and takes the toy back to his shop.

Cast
Ernest Borgnine - Grandfather
Mark Hurtado -  Grandson

First Subplot
George Milan -  Merlin
Bunny Summers -  Zurella
John Terrence -  Jonathan Cooper III
Patricia Sansone -  Madeline Cooper
Nicholas Noyes -  Nicholas
Hillary Young - Nicholas' Mother
Julia Leigh Miller -  Antique Store Clerk
Ben Sussman - Jake Cosgrove
Randy Chandler -  Burglar
Richelle Hurtado -  Baby

The Devil's Gift
Bob Mendelsohn - David Andrews
Struan Robertson -  Michael Andrews
Bruce Parry -  Pete
Vicki Saputo - Susan
Madelon Phillips - Adrianne the Psychic
J. Renee Gilbert - Grandma
Olwen Morgan - Elmira Johnson
Barry Chandler - Man In Car
Ángeles Olazábal - Girl On Bike

Production
The second segment of the film is a recut version of The Devil's Gift, a 1984 film made by the same director.  Large elements of the original film's storyline are missing, and segments with Merlin are added to show him pursuing the toy monkey.  The original film's dark ending, in which the monkey kills the entire family, is replaced with Merlin arriving just in time to stop it.

Legacy

Mystery Science Theater 3000 version 
The film was one of the last works to be featured on Mystery Science Theater 3000s original run (although its airing was delayed due to rights issues). The hosts and writers of the show used the sloppy editing on the second subplot, the disconnection between the two halves of the movie, and the wildly varying tone of the film as the basis for many of the jokes.  The film's presentation as family friendly fantasy, juxtaposed against its dark narrative is also used as the basis of numerous jokes.  The framing story of the Ernest Borgnine character telling these as stories to his grandson is also used for humor.  A wraparound segment depicted host Mike (Michael J. Nelson) and his robot companions taking a look at an (invented) range of Ernest Borgnine children's books, whose benign titles and presentation belied the frightful nature of the stories therein, with the exception of one which has a macabre appearance but features an innocent story. Another host segment depicted Mike turning into a baby due to his disbelief in magic.

RiffTrax 
On December 29, 2020, RiffTrax released a VOD version featuring Mystery Science Theater 3000 alums Michael J. Nelson, Kevin Murphy, and Bill Corbett.

See also 

Balloon Land - featured on the second segment
Ultraman - also featured on the second segment
E.T. The Extra-Terrestrial - poster featured in the second segment
Rock n' roll
Martian

References

External links
 
 
 

1996 films
1996 horror films
Works based on Merlin
1996 fantasy films
Arthurian films
1990s rediscovered films
Rediscovered American films
Animated anthology films
Compilation films
American direct-to-video films
1990s English-language films